The 2003 Melbourne thunderstorm was a severe weather event that occurred over the city of Melbourne, Australia, and surrounding areas of Victoria, from 1 to 6 December 2003. The Australian Bureau of Meteorology called the storm a "once in 100-year event".

According to the Bureau of Meteorology, the storm formed at around midnight on the night of 2 December over Craigieburn, then grew in size as it moved in a south-easterly direction (the Bureau issued a severe thunderstorm warning based on their observations at 11.38 pm). The two hours from midnight to 2 am saw extremely heavy rainfall, with some areas recording more than 100 mm of rain in that time. The rapid rainfall caused flash flooding, which resulted in extensive damage to property.

A number of motorists were trapped on the roofs of their cars as chest-high floodwater accumulated under the Bulleen Road Bridge on the Eastern Freeway. They were rescued by Melbourne's Metropolitan Fire Brigade using two maritime response unit boats. Severe hailstorms caused thousands of dollars of damage to cars in the suburb of Lilydale. Rail company Connex Melbourne announced that flooding and power damage at Blackburn, Surrey Hills and Boronia railway stations would cause transport delays the following day. Victoria Police arrested two people in connection with incidents of looting in Fairfield which had occurred during the height of the storms.

See also
 Extreme weather events in Melbourne

References

External links
Photo Gallery, The Age.
STORMPLANET – Severe Event Reports
Radar loop of the storm over Melbourne

Melbourne thunderstorm
Melbourne thunderstorm, 2003
Melbourne thunderstorm, 2003
Natural disasters in Australia
2000s in Melbourne